The following is the standings of the 3rd Division's 2007/08 football season. This is the 4th rated football competition in Iran after the Azadegan League,  Persian Gulf Cup and 2nd Division.

Teams

Group 1
 Khayerin Marand
 Setare Hashtgerd
 Setare Sorkh Zanjan
 Shahrdari Ardebil
 Shahrdari Lahijan
 Shahrdari Shahr-e Qods

Group 2
 Choka Talesh
 Dorna Tehran
 Fajr Gilan
 Iran Khodro Rey
 Mighat Qom
 Oghab Gonbad

Group 3
 Bargh Bistoon Kermanshah
 Ehsan Rey
 Parnia Malayer
 Pars Malek Ashtar Arak
 Shahin Karaj
 Shisheh Qazvin

Group 4
 04 Birjand Birjand
 Abfa Saravan Sistan and Baluchestan
 Shahrdari Kerman
 Shahrdari Yazd
 Takht-e-Jamshid Shiraz
 Tarbiat Badani Bandar Abbas

Group 5
 Esteghlal Shahrood
 Persepolis Qa'em Shahr
 Petroshimi Bojnurd
 Raad Tehran
 Saba Battery Golestan
 Shahrdari Eslamshahr
 Shahrdari Mashhad

Group 6
 Esteghlal Takestan
 Persepolis Ilam
 Samand Tehran
 San'at Kermanshah
 Sardar Bokan
 Shahrdari Baneh
 Shahrdari Hamedan

Group 7
 Abozar Gangan Bushehr
 Loleh Sasi Ahvaz
 Mes Novin Kerman
 Paris Esfahan
 Persepolis Genaveh
 Persepolis Kashan
 Sazman Varzesh Kish Kish

Group 8
 Moghvemat Bushehr
 Naft Novin Abadan
 Naft Va Gaz Gachsaran
 Persepolis Khorramabad
 Shahed Najaf Abad
 Shahrdari Borazjan
 Shahrekord F.C. Shahrekord

Second round

Group A
 Abozar Gangan Bushehr
 Loleh Sasi Ahvaz
 Naft Novin Abadan
 Samand Tehran
 Shahed Najaf Abad
 Shahrdari Hamedan
 Shahrdari Kerman - (Promoted in 2nd Division 2008-09)
 Tarbiat Badani Bandar Abbas - (Promoted in 2nd Division 2008-09)

Group B
 Dorna Tehran
 Ehsan Rey
 Fajr Gilan
 Persepolis Qa'em Shahr
 Raad Tehran - (Promoted in 2nd Division 2008-09)
 Setare Hashtgerd
 Shahrdari Lahijan - (Promoted in 2nd Division 2008-09)
 Shisheh Qazvin

References

League 3 (Iran) seasons
4